Peirene Press is an independent publishing house based in London. Established by novelist and publisher Meike Ziervogel, Peirene is primarily focused on bringing out high-quality English translations of contemporary European short novels. Peirene is also known for its regular literary salons, and for its pop-up bookstalls outside supermarkets and at farmers markets. Peirene Press donates 50p from the sale of each book to Counterpoint Arts, a charity that promotes the creative arts by and about refugees and migrants in the UK..

List of books

2010 – Female Voice
 Beside the Sea by Véronique Olmi (translated from the French by Adriana Hunter)
 Stone in a Landslide by Maria Barbal (translated from the Catalan: Laura McGloughlin and Paul Mitchell)
 Portrait of the Mother as a Young Woman by Friedrich Christian Delius (translated from the German: Jamie Bulloch)

2011 – Male Dilemma
 Next World Novella by Matthias Politycki (translated from the German: Anthea Bell)
 Tomorrow Pamplona by Jan van Mersbergen (translated from the Dutch: Laura Watkinson)
 Maybe This Time by Alois Hotschnig (translated from the Austrian German: Tess Lewis)

2012 – Small Epic
 The Brothers by Asko Sahlberg (translated from the Finnish: Fleur Jeremiah and Emily Jeremiah)
 The Murder of Halland by Pia Juul (translated from the Danish: Martin Aitken)
 Sea of Ink by Richard Weihe (translated from the German: Jamie Bulloch)

2013 – Turning Point
 The Mussel Feast by Birgit Vanderbeke (translated from the German: Jamie Bulloch)
 Mr Darwin's Gardener by Kristina Carlson (translated from the Finnish: Emily Jeremiah and Fleur Jeremiah)
 Chasing the King of Hearts by Hanna Krall (translated from the Polish: Philip Boehm)

2014 – Coming of Age
 The Dead Lake by Hamid Ismailov (translated from the Russian: Andrew Bromfield)
 The Blue Room by Hanne Ørstavik (translated from the Norwegian: Deborah Dawkin)
 Under The Tripoli Sky by Kamal Ben Hameda (translated from the French: Adriana Hunter)

2015 – Chance Encounter
 White Hunger by Aki Ollikainen (translated from the Finnish: Fleur Jeremiah and Emily Jeremiah)
 Reader for Hire by Raymond Jean (translated from the French: Adriana Hunter)
 The Looking-Glass Sisters by Gøhril Gabrielsen (translated from the Norwegian: John Irons)

2016 – Fairy Tale
 The Man I Became by Peter Verhelst (translated from the Dutch: by David Colmer)
 Her Father's Daughter by Marie Sizun (translated from the French: Adriana Hunter)
 The Empress and the Cake by Linda Stift (translated from the Austrian German: Jamie Bulloch)

2017 – East and West
 The Last Summer by Ricarda Huch (translated from the German: Jamie Bulloch)
 The Orange Grove by Larry Tremblay (translated from the French: Sheila Fischman)
 Dance by the Canal by Kerstin Hensel (translated from the German: Jen Calleja)

2018 – Home in Exile
 Soviet Milk by Nora Ikstena (translated from the Latvian: Margita Gailitis)
 Shadows on the Tundra by Dalia Grinkevičiutė (translated from the Lithuanian: Delija Valiukenas)
 And the Wind Sees All by Guđmundur Andri Thorsson (translated from the Icelandic: Bjørg Arnadottir) and Andrew Cauthery

2019 – There Be Monsters
 Children of the Cave by Virve Sammalkorpi (translated from the Finnish: Emily Jeremiah & Fleur Jeremiah)
 You Would Have Missed Me by Birgit Vanderbeke (translated from the German: Jamie Bulloch)
 Faces on the Tip of My Tongue by Emmanuelle Pagano (translated from the French: Jennifer Higgins and Sophie Lewis)

2020 – Closed Universe 
 Snow, Dog, Foot by Claudio Morandini (translated from the Italian by J Ockenden)
 Ankomst by Gøhril Gabrielsen (translated from the Norwegian by Deborah Dawkin)
 The Pear Field by Nana Ekvtimishvili (translated from the Georgian by Elizabeth Heighway)

2021 – Metamorphoses 
 Peirene #34 – Nordic Fauna by Andrea Lundgren (translated from the Swedish by John Litell)
 Peirene #35 – Yesterday by Juan Emar (translated by Megan McDowell)
 Peirene #36 – Winter Flowers by Angélique Villeneuve (translated by Adriana Hunter)

2022
 Peirene #37 – Marzahn, Mon Amour by Katja Oskamp (translated by Jo Heinrich)

Awards
 Independent Publishers Guild Newcomer Award 2011.
 Highly commended at the British Book Design and Production Awards 2011 and 2013.
 Peirene titles have been long-listed for the Independent Foreign Fiction Prize in 2011, 2012, 2013, 2014 and 2015.

References

Publishing companies based in London